Peña Pobre is a barrio in the municipality of Naguabo, Puerto Rico. Its population in 2010 was 4,131.

History
Puerto Rico was ceded by Spain in the aftermath of the Spanish–American War under the terms of the Treaty of Paris of 1898 and became an unincorporated territory of the United States. In 1899, the United States Department of War conducted a census of Puerto Rico finding that the population of Peña Pobre barrio was 1,064.

Sectors
Barrios (which are roughly comparable to minor civil divisions) in turn are further subdivided into smaller local populated place areas/units called sectores (sectors in English). The types of sectores may vary, from normally sector to urbanización to reparto to barriada to residencial, among others.

The following sectors are in Peña Pobre barrio:

Hurricane Maria
Peña Pobre was hit especially hard by Hurricane Maria on September 20, 2017. The infrastructure had been destroyed and Puerto Ricans were finding it very difficult to find ingredients for cooking, money for buying food, or gasoline to move around. This community is located up in the mountains accessed through steep, curvy roads which had lost their borders. The community worked to cook and deliver meals to families that could not feed themselves and their families.

See also

 List of communities in Puerto Rico
 List of barrios and sectors of Naguabo, Puerto Rico

References

Barrios of Naguabo, Puerto Rico